The dodrans (a contraction of Latin dequadrans: "less a quarter") or nonuncium (from Latin nona uncia: "ninth twelfth") was an Ancient Roman bronze coin produced during the Roman Republic.

The dodrans, valued at three quarters of an as (nine unciae), was produced only twice:

 in 126 BC by C. Cassius, in combination with the bes, another very rare denomination which was valued at two thirds of an as.
 in the 2nd century BC by M. Caecilius Metellus Q. f. (perhaps Marcus Caecilius Metellus, consul 115 BC), in combination with the denarius and other Æ coins, e.g. the semis, triens, and quadrans.

Dodrans as a unit may refer to a time span of forty-five minutes (three quarters of an hour) or a length of nine inches (three quarters of a foot). It has also been used to refer to the metrical pattern ¯˘˘¯˘¯, which constitutes the last three quarters of the glyconic line. Also called the choriambo-cretic, the pattern is common in Aeolic verse.

See also

 Roman currency
 Ancient Greek coinage

References

External links
 Dodrans

Coins of ancient Rome